The 2006 Cornell Big Red football team represented Cornell University in the 2006 NCAA Division I FCS football season. Cornell tied for fourth in the Ivy League. They were led by third-year head coach Jim Knowles and played their home games at Schoellkopf Field in Hamilton, New York. Cornell finished the season 5–5 overall and 3–4 in Ivy League play.

Schedule

References

Cornell
Cornell Big Red football seasons
Cornell Big Red football